The 1949 Texas Longhorns football team represented the University of Texas in the 1949 college football season.

Schedule

References

Texas
Texas Longhorns football seasons
Texas Longhorns football